Pevensey & Westham railway station serves the villages of Pevensey and Westham in East Sussex, England. It is on the East Coastway Line, and train services are provided by Southern.

History
The station opened as Westham and Pevensey on 27 June 1846 with the opening of the line between Lewes and St.Leonards (Bulverhythe). It was renamed Pevensey & Westham in January 1851 but in November 1851 was renamed Pevensey until January 1890 when it received its present name. Electric trains began serving the station in 1935. The signal box closed in 2015 when new signalling was introduced controlled from Three Bridges Regional Operations Centre.

Gallery

Services 
The typical off-peak service from the station is:
1tph (trains per hour) to London Victoria via the East Coastway Line (semi-fast via Eastbourne)
1tph to Brighton via the East Coastway Line (semi-fast)
1tph to Eastbourne
2tph to Ore via the East Coastway Line (one stopping, one fast)
1tph to Ashford International (stopping)

On Sunday the typical service is:

1tph to London Victoria (semi-fast via Eastbourne)
1tph to Ore (stopping)

References

External links 

Railway stations in East Sussex
DfT Category E stations
Former London, Brighton and South Coast Railway stations
Railway stations in Great Britain opened in 1846
Railway stations served by Govia Thameslink Railway
1846 establishments in England
Wealden District